Drobacia banatica  is a species of medium-sized air-breathing land snail, a terrestrial pulmonate gastropod mollusk in the family Helicidae, the typical snails.

Synonyms of this species include:
 Chilostoma (Drobacia) banaticum
 Chilostoma banatica
 Helicogona banatica

Description
The width of the shell is approximately 25 mm.

Distribution
This species occurs in Eastern Europe, in Ukraine, Hungary,  and in Romania.

Habitat

References

Helicidae
Gastropods described in 1838